The Nasdaq Financial-100 (^IXF) is a stock market index operated by Nasdaq consisting of companies that are listed on the Nasdaq stock exchange and that are in the financial services industry, including banking, insurance, mortgages and securities trading. It was created in 1985 as the sister index to the more widely followed Nasdaq-100.

Standards for eligibility
To qualify for membership in the index, the following standards must be met:
 It must engage in one of these categories: banking, insurance, security trading, brokerage, mortgages, debt collection, and real estate.
 It must be seasoned on the Nasdaq for a period of three months.
 It must be current in regards to SEC filings.
 It cannot be in bankruptcy.
 If a company has multiple classes of stock, all classes that meet minimum market capitalization standards will be included. At this moment, however, all companies in the index have only one class of stock in this index.
 Unlike the Nasdaq-100 index, there are no minimum weight requirements, and no volume minimums to meet either.

The index is rebalanced annually in June. Components that are in the top 100 of financial companies are allowed to remain in the index. If a component is between positions 101 to 125, it is given a year to move into the top 100 of eligible stocks; if it cannot meet this standard, the stock is then dropped. Any component that is not in the top 125 at the time of rebalance is dropped. All vacancies, including those done whenever a corporate action makes a component ineligible, through acquisition or delisting, are filled by the highest ranked component not in the index. Unlike the Nasdaq-100, where changes are announced in advance, changes in the Nasdaq Financial-100 are not made public by Nasdaq.

Components
The following companies are in the index.

 AGNC Investment
 American National Insurance
 Ameris Bancorp
 Arch Capital Group
 Atlantic Union Bank
 BancFirst
 Bank OZK
 Banner Bank
 BOK Financial Corporation
 Brighthouse Financial
 Capitol Federal Savings Bank
 Cathay General Bancorp
 Cincinnati Financial
 CME Group
 Coinbase
 Columbia Banking System
 Columbia Financial
 Commerce Bancshares
 Credit Acceptance
 CVB Financial
 East West Bank
 Eastern Bank
 eHealthInsurance
 Enstar Group
 Erie Insurance Group
 Fifth Third Bank
 First Citizens BancShares
 First Financial Bancorp
 First Financial Bankshares
 First Hawaiian Bank
 First Merchants Corporation
 FirstCash
 Focus Financial Partners
 Fulton Financial Corporation
 Futu
 Glacier Bancorp
 Goosehead Insurance
 Hamilton Lane
 Hancock Whitney
 Heartland Financial USA
 Huntington Bancshares
 Independent Bank
 Independent Bank Group
 Interactive Brokers
 International Bancshares Corporation
 Investors Bank
 Kinsale Capital Group
 LendingTree
 Live Oak Bank
 LPL Financial
 MarketAxess Holdings, Inc.
 Morningstar, Inc.
 Nasdaq, Inc.
 Navient Corporation
 NMI Holdings
 Northern Trust
 Old National Bancorp
 Open Lending
 Opendoor
 Pacific Premier Bancorp
 PacWest Bancorp
 Pinnacle Financial Partners
 Popular, Inc.
 Principal Financial Group
 Regency Centers
 Renasant Bank
 Sandy Spring Bank
 Seacoast Banking Corporation of Florida
 SEI Investments Company
 Selective Insurance Group
 Signature Bank
 Simmons Bank
 Sallie Mae
 South State Bank
 SVB Financial Group
 T. Rowe Price
 Texas Capital Bank
 TFS Financial
 The Carlyle Group
 Towne Bank
 Tradeweb
 Triumph Bancorp
 Trupanion
 Trustmark Bank
 UMB Financial Corporation
 Umpqua Holdings Corporation
 United Bank
 United Community Bank
 Upstart Holdings
 Valley Bank
 Virtu Financial
 Virtus Investment Partners
 Washington Federal
 WesBanco
 Westamerica Bank
 Wintrust Financial Corporation
 WSFS Bank
 XP Inc.
 Zillow
 Zions Bancorporation

References

 
American stock market indices
Nasdaq